Donald Ray Crockett (born January 5, 1967) is a former American football player in the National Football League. He played for fourteen years in the NFL and earned two Super Bowl rings with the Denver Broncos as a cornerback. He played his high school football at Duncanville High School in Duncanville, Texas.  He played college football at Baylor from 1984 to 1988, and was inducted into the Baylor athletic hall of fame in 2008. He notably returned an interception 96 yards for a touchdown against Dallas in 1991. On 20 Sep 1998, he intercepted Jeff George in the third quarter and returned it 25 yards, then did it again in the 4th quarter, returning it 80 yards for a touchdown, and Broncos record 105 combined interception yards.

In 2005, he co-starred (with Dick Butkus) in the ESPN reality show Bound for Glory, in which they both took on the task of coaching a high school football team.

He appeared on the NBC game show Identity, as one of the twelve people whose identity the contestant had to guess. The contestant correctly identified him as a football player.

In 2008, he collaborated with Morgan Spurlock (creator of the show 30 Days and the popular film Super Size Me) to be on an episode of 30 Days.  In the episode, Crockett spent 30 days using a wheelchair to get around.  He chose to be on the show after witnessing a paralyzing injury of former Detroit Lions teammate Mike Utley in 1991.  The rapper and producer Birdman is seen wearing his jersey in the music video of the song "I made it" by Kevin Rudolf featuring Lil' Wayne, Jaysean and Birdman.

In 2019, he joined Your EFO "Your Championship Tax Office" and is currently the VP of Operations.

Crockett lives in Dallas, Texas.

References

External links
Ray Crockett stats at ESPN.com
 

1967 births
Living people
People from Dallas
People from Duncanville, Texas
Duncanville High School alumni
American football cornerbacks
Baylor Bears football players
Detroit Lions players
Denver Broncos players
Kansas City Chiefs players